Yaapeet is a town in the Wimmera region of western Victoria, Australia.

Facilities in the town include a primary school and a recreation reserve.  Wyperfeld National Park and Lake Albacutya are nearby landmarks. It is the terminus for the reopened Yaapeet railway line.

References

Wimmera
Towns in Victoria (Australia)